Huddle Park is one of Johannesburg´s biggest parks. It is situated on a wetland and is adjacent to the suburbs of Linksfield and Orange Grove. It comprises approx. 200 hectares of grassland and woodland, with three tree-lined dams providing fishing and bird-watching opportunities. Three golf courses take up most of the space on the park, and, although the blue course is a former SA open course and is still playable, the white and the yellow courses has been left untended for years and have gone to seed. It is one of Johannesburg´s most underutilised and underdeveloped parks, with a property tussle underway for over ten years, with developers wanting to turn the park into anything from casinos to golf estates, and residents beating it back every time. This parks decline is a classic story of new South African mismanagement and corruption with the Johannesburg city council champing at the bit to sell the park for a quick buck. Their granting of leases with very onerous terms (such as a 6-month notice period on 20-year leases) means no-one would invest in the park resulting in its decline and likely sale for property development purposes. The bulk of the legal defense of the park has been done by the Huddle and Environs Anti Degradation (HEAD) league. Unfortunately they have no web presence. The park has been defended by various other groups of residents, including the Friends of Huddle Park and the Huddle Huggers, who have also created the Facebook group  Save Huddle Park. Residents groups insist that more is done with the park as golfers already have much choice in the area. Ideas they have put forward and would like to see are cycle and mountain bike tracks and trails, running and walking tracks and trails. Securing a section of the park specifically as an eco-park for the education of the public about wetlands and bird life is also a popular idea and was agreed in principle with the current manager. All of these services have not been acted upon and the future of the park remains hanging in balance unless the park can become more of a public service and less of an eyesore.

See also
Johannesburg City Parks

External links
Website of the golf club on the park

Parks in Johannesburg
Birdwatching sites